Jiří Holík (born July 9, 1944) is a Czech former professional ice hockey player and coach. Holík played for Dukla Jihlava in the Czechoslovak Extraliga and was a member of the Czechoslovakian national ice hockey team. Holík was a member of the Czechoslovak 1976 Canada Cup team. He was also a member of the country's medal winning teams at the 1964, 1968, 1972, and 1976 Winter Olympics.

His brother Jaroslav was also a hockey player.

Holík later worked as a coach, being known for his temperament and active coaching style.

Playing career
Holík joined the local Jiskra Havlíčkův Brod club in 1952. Holík would play for various levels of the club, finishing with the Czechoslovak Second Division team in 1963. In 1963, Holík moved up to the HC Dukla Jihlava team of the Czechoslovak Elite League. He would be a member of Dukla Jihlava for the next fifteen seasons. His best goal-scoring season was 1968–69, when he scored 28 goals in the season. In 1969–70, Holík had his best point total of 40 points, on 23 goals and 17 assists. Holík joined Rosenheim in Germany in 1978, playing two seasons before moving to Stadlau Wien in Vienna, Austria for 1980–81. Holík retired from playing after that season, but returned to active play for one more season with Wiener EV in the Austrian Second Division in 1984–85.

Starting in 1964, Holík played internationally for the Czechoslovak national men's team. Holík played in a total of four Olympics and twelve World Championships for Czechoslovakia. He also played in the 1976 Canada Cup for Czechoslovakia.

References

External links 
 
 
 
 

1944 births
Living people
Czech ice hockey left wingers
Czechoslovak ice hockey left wingers
Czech ice hockey coaches
HC Dukla Jihlava players
Ice hockey players at the 1964 Winter Olympics
Ice hockey players at the 1968 Winter Olympics
Ice hockey players at the 1972 Winter Olympics
Ice hockey players at the 1976 Winter Olympics
IIHF Hall of Fame inductees
Masaryk University alumni
Medalists at the 1964 Winter Olympics
Medalists at the 1968 Winter Olympics
Medalists at the 1972 Winter Olympics
Medalists at the 1976 Winter Olympics
Olympic ice hockey players of Czechoslovakia
Olympic bronze medalists for Czechoslovakia
Olympic medalists in ice hockey
Olympic silver medalists for Czechoslovakia
Sportspeople from Havlíčkův Brod
Recipients of Medal of Merit (Czech Republic)
Czechoslovak expatriate sportspeople in West Germany
Czechoslovak expatriate sportspeople in Austria
Czechoslovak expatriate ice hockey people
Expatriate ice hockey players in West Germany
Expatriate ice hockey players in Austria